František Šafránek (2 January 1931 – 27 June 1987) was a Czech football player.

Šafránek played for several clubs, including Spartak Sokolovo (1949–1952) and Dukla Prague (1952–1966).

He played for Czechoslovakia national team (22 matches and one goal), and was a participant at the 1954 FIFA World Cup, where he played in two matches, at the 1958 FIFA World Cup, and at the 1960 UEFA European Football Championship.

He died from heart failure during the match of former Dukla Prague players in June 1987.

References 

 

1931 births
1987 deaths
Czech footballers
Czechoslovak footballers
1954 FIFA World Cup players
1958 FIFA World Cup players
1960 European Nations' Cup players
Footballers from Prague
Czechoslovakia international footballers
AC Sparta Prague players
Dukla Prague footballers
Association football defenders